Guru Gobind Singh Khalsa College is an independent faith school in Chigwell, Essex. It occupies the buildings of the former Buckhurst Hill County High School for Boys.

The school was judged Inadequate by Ofsted in three consecutive inspections up to 2019. In 2020 it was judged Good.

References

Private schools in Essex
Sikhism in England
Buildings and structures in Chigwell
Memorials to Guru Gobind Singh